The Craig Creek Cluster is a region recognized by The Wilderness Society for its unique high elevation mountains, vistas, trout streams and wildlife habitat. The cluster contains wildlands and wilderness areas along Craig Creek, a 65-mile long creek with headwaters at the Brush Mountain Wilderness near Blacksburg.

Popular for hiking, canoeing, mountain biking, hunting, horseback riding, and fishing, the area offers an opportunity for secluded recreation.  During the summer months the area is an escape from other public lands that are busy with visitors.

Description
The Craig Creek Wilderness Cluster contains  wilderness areas and wildlands recognized by the Wilderness Society as “Mountain Treasures”, areas that are worthy of protection from logging and road construction. 

The areas in the cluster are:
Wilderness Areas
Brush Mountain Wilderness
Brush Mountain East Wilderness
Wildareas recognized by the Wilderness Society as “Mountain Treasures”
Patterson Mountain
Broad Run (conservation area)
Spesard Knob
Price Mountain (conservation area)
Stone Coal Creek (conservation area)
North Mountain (conservation area)

Location and access

 
The cluster can be accessed from Va 615 which travels north from New Castle, Virginia to Oriskany, Virginia along the western side of the cluster. Access from other roads and trails are found on National Geographic Maps 788 (Covington, Alleghany Highlands. A great variety of information, including topographic maps, aerial views, satellite data and weather information, is obtained by selecting the link with the wild land’s coordinates  in the upper right of this page.

Price Mountain Trail and North Mountain Trail follow the ridge lines of the mountains with views of the valleys below.

Biological significance

The habitat of the southern Appalachians is rich in its biological diversity with nearly 10,000 species, some not found anywhere else.  The great diversity is related to the many ridges and valleys which form isolated communities in which species evolve separately from one another.  The region lies south of the glaciers that covered North America 11,000 years go.  To escape the glaciers, northern species retreated south to find refuge in the southern Appalachians.  When the glaciers retreated, many of these species remained along with the southern species that were native to the area.  The diversity includes trees, mosses, millipedes and salamanders.

Biodiversity in the southern Appalachians is being threatened by the cutting down of forests, damming off rivers and the paving of land for farms and towns, leading to the loss of species by fragmentation of the ecological landscape. Many species, once common and  abundant, are now confined to islands of refuge.  The national forests provide enclaves for the survival of many threatened species.

Rare species found in the area of the Craig Creek Cluster include a variety of flora and fauna--mussels,  the Atlantic Pigtoe and James Spineymussel; a fish, the Orange Madtom; mammals, the northern long-eared Myotis and the Indiana Bat;, and a vascular plant, the small whorled pogonia.

Geologic history
The cluster contains North Mountain, Patterson Mountain and Price Mountain; long, linear ridges, typical of the Ridge and Valley Province.   Craig Creek and  Catawba Creek, the two principal creeks in the area, are tributaries of the James River.

New Castle Ranger District
The cluster is in the former New Castle Ranger District, which has now been absorbed into the Eastern   Divide Ranger District. The New Castle Ranger District included Craig County and parts of Botetourt and Monroe County in West Virginia.
The ridges of the New Castle District were once covered with a forest composed of about 50% chestnut trees, often growing as high as 120 feet with a 10-foot diameter.  The wood was lightweight, straight-grained and split easily. Mast from the trees supplied nourishment to both people and wildlife.  In 1906 a fungus from China was introduced that killed 3.5 billion trees with a devastating effect on those who had come to depend on it. In 1938, The New Castle district had an estimated 15,000 – 20,000 cords of dead chestnut.

Between the late eighteenth and early nineteenth century, industrial woodcutting supplied charcoal firing for iron making.  Consuming an acre of forest per day, the cutting lay bare bottomland forest and mountainside  woods.  Following the Civil War, annual plowing and grazing created soil erosion impacting wildlife.  Game populations were reduced by unregulated hunting as well as the practice of field burning that left hillsides bare. Then construction of railroads in the late nineteenth and early twentieth centuries supported the intensive cutting of trees on an industrial level leading to degradation of much of the forests in southwest Virginia. The eastern national forests were created to restore the integrity of the forest lands.

Other clusters 
Other clusters of the Wilderness Society's "Mountain Treasures" in the Jefferson National Forest (north to south):

Glenwood Cluster
Barbours Creek-Shawvers Run Cluster
Sinking Creek Valley Cluster
Mountain Lake Wilderness Cluster
Angels Rest Cluster
Walker Mountain Cluster
Kimberling Creek Cluster
Garden Mountain Cluster
Mount Rogers Cluster 
Clinch Ranger District Cluster

References

Further reading
 Stephenson, Steven L., A Natural History of the Central Appalachians, 2013, West Virginia University Press, West Virginia, .
 Davis, Donald Edward, Where There Are Mountains, An Environmental History of the Southern Appalachians, 2000, University of Georgia Press, Athens, Georgia. .

External links
 George Washington and Jefferson National Forests
 Wilderness Society
 Geology of Virginia
 Vegetation of the Craig Creek Watershed
Protected areas of Virginia